DGSI may refer to:
 General Directorate for Internal Security, a French intelligence agency
 ICAO code for Kumasi Airport in Ghana